Ditepalanthus is a genus of flowering plants belonging to the family Balanophoraceae.

Its native range is Madagascar.

Species:

Ditepalanthus afzelii 
Ditepalanthus malagasicus

References

Balanophoraceae
Santalales genera